Manjrekar is a surname. Notable people with the surname include:

Mahesh Manjrekar (born 1953), Indian film director, actor, writer, and producer
Minad Manjrekar (born 1996), Indian cricketer
Sanjay Manjrekar (born 1965), Indian cricketer
Vijay Manjrekar (1931–1983), Indian cricketer